Liolaemus carlosgarini, Garín's lizard, is a species of lizard in the family  Liolaemidae. It is native to Chile.

References

carlosgarini
Reptiles described in 2013
Reptiles of Chile
Endemic fauna of Chile